Mac OS Roman is a character encoding created by Apple Computer, Inc. for use by Macintosh computers. It is suitable for representing text in English and several other Western languages. Mac OS Roman encodes 256 characters, the first 128 of which are identical to ASCII, with the remaining characters including mathematical symbols, diacritics, and additional punctuation marks. Mac OS Roman is an extension of the original Macintosh character set, which encoded only 217 characters. Full support for Mac OS Roman first appeared in System 6.0.4, released in 1989, and the encoding is still supported in current versions of macOS, though the standard character encodings are now UTF-8 or UTF-16. Apple modified Mac OS Roman in 1998 with the release of Mac OS 8.5 by replacing the currency sign at position hexadecimal 0xDB with the euro sign, but otherwise the encoding has been unchanged since its release.

Character set 

The following table shows how characters are encoded in Mac OS Roman. The row and column headings give the first and second digit of the hexadecimal code for each character in the table.

Technical notes 

The Internet Assigned Numbers Authority identifies this encoding using the string "macintosh". The MIME Content-Type for this encoding is therefore "text/plain; charset=macintosh".  The Microsoft Windows code page number is 10000. IBM uses code page/CCSID 1275.

With the release of Mac OS X, Mac OS Roman and all other "scripts" (as classic Mac OS called them) were replaced by UTF-8 as the standard character encoding for the Macintosh operating system. However, the default character encoding in Java for Mac OS X remained MacRoman, and the keyboard layout with its combination of control, option, and dead keys still map to the original characters in MacRoman. The default character encoding for Java can be changed to UTF-8 by adding the following line to .profile:

With Java 18 and later, the default character encoding is UTF-8 across platforms, including macOS.

See also 
 Western Latin character sets (computing)

Notes 

Character sets
Roman
Articles with unsupported PUA characters
Computer-related introductions in 1987